The Decoration for Services to the Liberation of Austria was created by federal law on 27 January 1976.  It is a special distinction for men and women who actively resisted the Nazi regime contributing to Austria’s liberation from Nazi rule. The President of Austria confers this honour when sent a proposal by the Federal Chancellor based on a report from the Committee on the Austrian Liberation Decoration of Honour.

See also
Honours system in the Republic of Austria

References

Orders, decorations, and medals of Austria

1976 establishments in Austria
Awards established in 1976